was a village located in Age District, Mie Prefecture, Japan.

As of 2003, the village had an estimated population of 4,164 and a density of 82.77 persons per km². The total area was 50.31 km².

On January 1, 2006, Misato, along with the city of Hisai, the towns of Anō, Geinō and Kawage (all from Age District), the towns of Hakusan, Ichishi and Karasu, and the village of Misugi (all from Ichishi District), was merged into the expanded city of Tsu and thus no longer exists as an independent municipality.

External links
 Official website of Tsu 

Dissolved municipalities of Mie Prefecture
Populated places disestablished in 2006
2006 disestablishments in Japan
Tsu, Mie